City Lights is an album by Dr. John, his first for Horizon Records. It was released in 1978.

Neon Park provided the album artwork.

Production
Doc Pomus collaborated with Dr. John on a few of the album's songs.

Critical reception
The Globe and Mail wrote that Dr. John's "honky-tonk piano sounds especially fine and strange against the lushness of strings - the title song virtually drips with sweet decadence."

Entertainment Weekly wrote that the album "established Dr. John as a skilled songwriter." Phoenix New Times deemed "He's a Hero" " the ultimate hipster-in-the-night song." Writing after the musician's death, Billboard thought that the title track, "combining stride piano, strings and an evocative lyric, displays a subtlety Dr. John wouldn’t fully commit to again."

Track listing

All songs written by Mac Rebennack (Dr. John) except where noted

Side One
 "Dance the Night Away With You" (Rebennack, Doc Pomus) – 4:06
 "Street Side" – 6:01
 "Wild Honey" (Rebennack, Bobby Charles) – 4:10
 "Rain" – 4:48

Side Two
 "Snake Eyes" – 6:44
 "Fire of Love" (Rebennack, Alvin Robinson) – 3:58
 "Sonata (instrumental)/He's a Hero" (Pomus, Rebennack) – 5:20
 "City Lights" (Pomus, Rebennack) – 3:22

Personnel
Musicians
 Dr. John – piano, vocals, Fender Rhodes and clavinet on "Street Side", Fender Rhodes on "Rain"
 Hugh McCracken – acoustic & electric guitars, Moog synthesizer on "Fire of Love", harmonica on "Street Side"
 John Tropea – acoustic & electric guitars
 Will Lee – bass guitar
 Steve Gadd – drums
 Richard Tee – Fender Rhodes, Hammond organ, clavinet, synthesizer, piano
 Arthur Jenkins – percussion
 Charlie Miller – cornet
 Neil Larsen – Hammond organ on "Street Side" and "Fire of Love"
 George Young – tenor saxophone
 David Sanborn – alto saxophone
 Ronnie Cuber – baritone saxophone
 Barry Rogers – trombone
 Ronnie Barron – background vocals
 George & Nancy Jones – background vocals
 Tamiya Lynn – background vocals
 Alvin Robinson  – background vocals
 Plas Johnson – tenor saxophone on "Fire of Love" and "He's a Hero"
 Alvin Batiste – clarinet solo on "He's a Hero"
 Buzz Feiten – guitar solo on "Snake Eyes"

Technical
 Tommy LiPuma – producer
 Hugh McCracken – producer
 Hank Cicalo – engineer
 Kevin Herron – engineer
 Al Schmitt – engineer, mixing
 Don Henderson – assistant engineer
 David Prentice – assistant engineer
 Erick Labson – mastering
 Mike Reese – mastering
 Christine Martin – production assistant
 Cameron Mizell – production coordination
 Hollis King – art direction
 Isabelle Wong – design
 Neon Park – cover painting

Arrangements
 Dr. John – horn arrangements, rhythm arrangements
 Hugh McCracken – horn arrangements, rhythm arrangements
 Claus Ogerman – string arrangements, conductor

References

1978 albums
Dr. John albums
Albums produced by Tommy LiPuma
Horizon Records albums
Albums arranged by Claus Ogerman
Albums conducted by Claus Ogerman
A&M Records albums
Albums with cover art by Neon Park
Albums recorded at Capitol Studios